Butler Cove is a bay in the U.S. state of Washington.

Butler Cove was named after John L. Butler, a pioneer settler.

References

Landforms of Thurston County, Washington
Bays of Washington (state)